, also known as Murase Shūho (村瀬 秀甫), was the first Japanese professional go player to have a reputation in the Western world.

Biography
A disciple in the Hon'inbō house, he founded the Hoensha institution and taught the game of Go to a German visitor by the name of Oskar Korschelt. Korschelt later was the first person to spread and popularize Go to any effect,  in a non-Asian country. Shūho became the 18th Hon'inbō in 1886.

Shūho became a student in the Hon'inbō house at the age of seven and was awarded a 1-dan rank in 1848, reaching 6-dan in 1861. He was the strongest Hon'inbō disciple after Shūsaku, and Shūwa wanted to make him his heir when Shūsaku died, but Jōwa's widow blocked this plan. He became head of the Hoensha in 1879.  Shūho published the famous book Hoen Shinpo in 1882, which outlined the Meiji era fuseki. After a rapprochement between the Hoensha and the Honinbo house in 1886, Shūei promoted Shūho to 8-dan and stepped aside to allow him to become head of the Hon'inbō house. Shūho died only three months after becoming Hon'inbō. In the last few years of his life he was the strongest player in Japan.

1838 births
1886 deaths
Japanese Go players
19th-century Go players